Sailycaspis is an extinct genus of ptychopariid trilobites of the family Ellipsocephalidae. It lived during the early part of the Botomian stage, which lasted from approximately 524 to 518.5 million years ago. This faunal stage was part of the Cambrian Period.

References

Ellipsocephalidae 
Ptychopariida genera
Cambrian trilobites
Cambrian trilobites of Asia
Cambrian trilobites of Europe